Sibelius is a crater on Mercury. Its name was adopted by the International Astronomical Union (IAU) in 1985. Sibelius is named for the Finnish composer Jean Sibelius.

Sibelius has a complex central peak that is offset from the center to the southwest.  Within the central peak complex is a dark spot of low reflectance material (LRM), closely associated with hollows.

To the south of Sibelius is the crater Vincente, and to the east are Delacroix and Shelley.

References

Impact craters on Mercury